Calvin Wayne Emery (June 28, 1937 – November 28, 2010), was a professional baseball first baseman and batting coach, who played in Major League Baseball (MLB) for the Philadelphia Phillies. He also spent the  season with Hankyu Braves of the Nippon Professional Baseball (NPB). Emery attended Penn State University.

Career

Emery was signed by the Philadelphia Phillies as an amateur free agent, on June 5, 1958. About 5 years later, on July 15, 1963, at the age of 26, he made his big league debut. In 16 career MLB games (most as a pinch hitter), he hit .158, in 19 at-bats. Of Emery’s 3 major league hits, one was a double; however, he showed a keen eye at the plate, by striking out only twice. (In a 500 at-bat season, that would only be about 53 strikeouts.) Emery played his final big league game on September 20, 1963.

During Emery's only MLB season, he wore uniform number 9.

The following season, he played for the NPB Hankyu Braves.

After his playing career, Emery managed in Minor League Baseball (MiLB), scouted for multiple organizations, and served as a big league batting coach for the  Chicago White Sox.

On November 28, 2010, Emery died at age 73 in Tulsa, Oklahoma.

Other information
Emery won the Most Outstanding Player Award in the 1957 College World Series.
Emery served as a coach for the Chicago White Sox in 1988.
Emery was the  MVP of the Three-I League (aka the Illinois–Indiana–Iowa League). He played for the Des Moines Demons.
Emery was selected as the first baseman on the 1969 Sporting News Triple-A West All-Star Team.

References

External links

1937 births
2010 deaths
American expatriate baseball players in Japan
Arkansas Travelers players
Asheville Tourists players
Bakersfield Bears players
Baltimore Orioles scouts
Baseball players from Pennsylvania
Buffalo Bisons (minor league) players
Chattanooga Lookouts players
Chicago White Sox coaches
Chicago White Sox scouts
Cincinnati Reds scouts
College World Series Most Outstanding Player Award winners
Des Moines Demons players
Eugene Emeralds players
Hankyu Braves players
Hawaii Islanders players
Indianapolis Indians players
Major League Baseball first basemen
Penn State Nittany Lions baseball players
Philadelphia Phillies players
Reading Phillies managers
Rochester Red Wings players
San Diego Padres (minor league) players
San Francisco Giants scouts
Seattle Angels players